Stipa is a genus of around 300 large perennial hermaphroditic grasses collectively known as feather grass, needle grass, and  spear grass. They are placed in the subfamily Pooideae and the tribe Stipeae, which also contains many species formerly assigned to Stipa, which have since been reclassified into new genera.

Many species are important forage crops. Several species such as Stipa brachytricha, S. arundinacea, S. splendens, S. calamagrostis, S. gigantea and S. pulchra are used as ornamental plants. One former species, esparto grass (Macrochloa tenacissima), is used for crafts and extensively in paper making.

It is a coarse grass with inrolled leaves and a panicle patterned inflorescence.

Ecology
Species of the genus Stipa can occur in grasslands or in savanna habitats. Certain specific prairie plant associations are dominated by grasses of the genus Stipa, which genus often lends its name to the terminology of some prairie types. In some areas of the western United States grasses of the genus Stipa form a significant part of the understory of Blue Oak savannas, and were even a more important element prehistorically before the invasion of many European grasses.

Selected species
Stipa avenacea – black oat grass
Stipa baicalensis Roshev.
Stipa barbata Desf.
Stipa bavarica
Stipa borysthenica
Stipa brachytricha – Korean feather grass
Stipa canadensis
Stipa capensis
Stipa capillata L.
Stipa coreana Honda – Korean needlegrass
Stipa grandis P.A.Smirn.
Stipa joannis Čelak.
Stipa leptogluma
Stipa mexicana
Stipa milleana
Stipa mollis
Stipa pennata L. – feather grass
Stipa pulcherrima
Stipa speciosa
Stipa tirsa Steven
Stipa tulcanensis
Stipa turkestanica Hack.
Stipa zalesskii Wilensky

Formerly placed here

Achnatherum aridum (as S. arida)
Achnatherum calamagrostis (L.) P.Beauv. (as S. calamagrostis (L.) Wahlenb.)
Achnatherum robustum (Vasey) Barkworth (as S. robusta (Vasey) Scribn.)
Achnatherum splendens (Trin.) Nevski (as S. splendens Trin.)
Celtica gigantea (Link) F. M. Vazquez & Barkworth (as S. gigantea Link)
Hesperostipa comata (as S. comata)
Jarava ichu Ruiz & Pav. (as S. ichu (Ruiz & Pav.) Kunth)
Macrochloa tenacissima (Loefl. ex L.) Kunth (as S. tenacissima Loefl. ex L.)
Nassella leucotricha (Trin. & Rupr.) R.W.Pohl (as S. leucotricha Trin. & Rupr.)
Nassella pulchra (Hitchc.) Barkworth (as S. pulchra Hitchc.)
Oryzopsis hymenoides (Ricker.) (as S. hymenoides Roem. & Schult.)
Nassella viridula (Trin.) Barkworth (as S. viridula Trin.)
Hesperostipa spartea (Trin.) Barkworth (as Stipa spartea Trin.)
Anemanthele lessoniana (Steud.) Veldkamp (as Stipa arundinacea Hook.f.)

See also
 Nassella

References

External links

 
Poaceae genera